John Maury Allin (April 22, 1921 – March 6, 1998) was an American Episcopal bishop who served as the 23rd Presiding Bishop of the Episcopal Church from 1974 to 1985.

Early life
Allin was born in Helena, Arkansas. He graduated from the University of the South at Sewanee, Tennessee, and its divinity school, then called St. Luke's Seminary, in 1945. He received a Master of Education degree in 1962 from Mississippi College in Clinton, Mississippi. He was ordained deacon on June 6, 1944, and priest on May 10, 1945. He served churches in Arkansas and Louisiana before becoming rector of All Saints' Junior College in Vicksburg, Mississippi, in 1958, a post he retained till 1961.

Bishop of Mississippi
He was bishop coadjutor of the Diocese of Mississippi, with his consecration taking place at St. James Church in Jackson, Mississippi, from 1961 to 1966. He was elected bishop in 1966 and would serve until 1974. He was involved in the Civil Rights Movement, helping to create the Committee of Concern, an alliance of ecumenical and civic leaders that helped rebuild more than 100 black churches that had been bombed by white supremacists in Mississippi.

Presiding Bishop
He served until he was elected Presiding Bishop in 1974. In 1978, he offered to resign because of his opposition as a theological conservative to women's ordination, but he was persuaded to remain in office. He was the last Presiding Bishop of the Episcopal Church to have opposed women's ordination and held a pro-life stance. He retired in 1985.

Retirement and personal life
After his term as Presiding Bishop, Allin was vicar at St. Ann's Episcopal Church in Kennebunkport, Maine, where his friend George H. W. Bush was on the vestry.

He was married to Ann; the couple had one son and three daughters.

Allin died in Jackson, Mississippi on March 6, 1998, aged 76.

See also
 List of presiding bishops of the Episcopal Church in the United States of America
 List of Episcopal bishops of the United States
 Historical list of the Episcopal bishops of the United States

References 

1921 births
1998 deaths
Mississippi College alumni
Presiding Bishops of the Episcopal Church in the United States of America
Sewanee: The University of the South alumni
People from Helena, Arkansas
20th-century American Episcopalians
Episcopal bishops of Mississippi
20th-century American clergy